Rahsaan Patterson is the debut studio album by American R&B group Rahsaan Patterson. It was released by MCA Records on January 28, 1997 in the United States. Produced by Dinky Bingham, Christopher Bolden, Keith Crouch, Jamey Jaz, Les Pierce, and Ira Schickman, the album peaked at number 48 on the US Billboard Top R&B/Hip-Hop Albums chart.

Critical reception

AllMusic editor Alex Henderson compared the singer's performance on his debut album with Stevie Wonder and added: "One thing Patterson won't be accused of is favoring style over substance – when many of his contemporaries in the urban contemporary market were heavily into gimmickry, Patterson kept things honest and straightforward on a disc that isn't breathtaking, but is heartfelt and satisfying." Billboard found that Rahsaan Patterson "issues a cavalcade of infectious tunes sure to attract a broad consumer base [...] Although the album taps vintage soul sounds, the overall feel remains grounded in contemporary rhythms."

Chart performance
Rahsaan Patterson peaked at number 48 on the US Billboard Top R&B/Hip-Hop Albums chart in the week ending February 15, 1997.

Track listing

Charts

Release history

References

1997 albums
MCA Records albums
Rahsaan Patterson albums